Bab Bhar Mosque, also known as  Ez-Zraariâ Mosque is a mosque in Tunis, Tunisia.

Localization 
It is located in the east side of the old town of Tunis, in the Helket Ez-Zitoun impasse, near Bab Bhar.

History 
This mosque was built by Ahmed Ibn Marzouk Ibn Abi Omara Mousseilli in 1282.

It has been restored between 1969 and 1973.

References

Mosques in Tunis